Billboard Japan is a sister organization of the U.S.-based music magazine Billboard. It is operated by the Japanese Osaka-based company Hanshin Contents Link (a subsidiary of Hanshin Electric Railway), holding an exclusive licence from Billboards parent company to the Billboard brand name in Japan, and manages, among others, the website www.billboard-japan.com and several "Billboard Live"-branded music clubs located in the country.

In February 2008, Hanshin Contents Link, under licence from Billboard, launched the Billboard Japan Hot 100 music chart. As of 2016, the list of charts compiled by Billboard Japan also includes an albums chart named Billboard Japan Hot Albums, sales-only-based charts Top Singles Sales, Top Albums Sales, Top Jazz Albums Sales, and Top Classical Albums Sales, a radio-airplay chart named Radio Songs, an animation music chart named Hot Animation, and a chart for foreign songs named Hot Overseas.

Since 2010, Billboard Japan holds an annual awards ceremony called the Billboard Japan Music Awards, which honors domestic and international artists who achieved the best results on Billboard Japans music charts during the previous year.

Charts

Singles and tracks

Albums

Artists

See also
 Billboard Japan Hot 100
 Billboard Japan Music Awards

References

External links
 Billboard Japan

Billboard (magazine)
Japanese news websites
Japanese music websites
Japanese-language websites
Magazines with year of establishment missing
Mass media in Osaka
Online music magazines
J-pop